Pinehurst is a city in Dooly County, Georgia, United States. The population was 455 at the 2010 census, up from 307 in 2000.

History
The Georgia General Assembly incorporated Pinehurst in 1895. The community was named for the pine trees abundant in Georgia.

Geography

Pinehurst is located northeast of the center of Dooly County at  (32.194472, -83.761112). U.S. Route 41 passes through the center of town as Pine Avenue, leading north  to Unadilla and south  to Vienna, the county seat. Interstate 75 passes just east of the town limits, with access from Exit 117; I-75 leads north  to Macon and south  to Tifton.

Demographics

As of the census of 2000, there were 307 people, 145 households, and 87 families residing in the city. The racial makeup of the city was 49.84% White, 49.19% African American, 0.33% Native American, and 0.65% from two or more races. Hispanic or Latino of any race were 1.95% of the population.

There were 145 households, out of which 22.1% had children under the age of 18 living with them, 42.1% were married couples living together, 15.9% had a female householder with no husband present, and 40.0% were non-families. 39.3% of all households were made up of individuals, and 13.8% had someone living alone who was 65 years of age or older.  The average household size was 2.12 and the average family size was 2.80.

In the city, the population was spread out, with 19.9% under the age of 18, 8.1% from 18 to 24, 23.5% from 25 to 44, 29.6% from 45 to 64, and 18.9% who were 65 years of age or older.  The median age was 44 years. For every 100 females, there were 90.7 males.  For every 100 females age 18 and over, there were 86.4 males.

The median income for a household in the city was $25,000, and the median income for a family was $43,000. Males had a median income of $23,750 versus $21,250 for females. The per capita income for the city was $15,673.  About 14.4% of families and 16.8% of the population were below the poverty line, including 14.0% of those under the age of eighteen and 21.0% of those 65 or over.

References

Cities in Georgia (U.S. state)
Cities in Dooly County, Georgia